Belinda Jane Cordwell (born 21 September 1965) is a sports commentator and a former professional tennis player from New Zealand, who represented her native country at the 1988 Summer Olympics in Seoul. A former world top 20 player, her best result in the Grand Slam events was reaching the semifinals of the 1989 Australian Open. Cordwell remains the highest ever ranked New Zealand singles player, either male or female in the open era.

Biography
During her career Cordwell won one WTA singles title (at Singapore) and two WTA doubles titles (at Singapore & Tokyo). Cordwell reached her highest individual ranking on the WTA Tour on 4 December 1989, when she became No. 17 in the world. Her most notable result was reaching the semifinals of the Australian Open in 1989, where she lost to Helena Suková. She represented New Zealand at the 1988 Summer Olympics, losing in the first round to Great Britain's Sara Gomer. After retiring Cordwell has worked as a television tennis commentator for One Sport and Sky Sport.

WTA career finals

Singles (1 title, 1 runner-up)

Doubles (2 titles, 3 runner-ups)

ITF finals

Singles: 6 (5–1)

Doubles: 17 (11–6)

References

 
 
 

1965 births
Living people
Hopman Cup competitors
Sports commentators
New Zealand female tennis players
Tennis players at the 1988 Summer Olympics
Olympic tennis players of New Zealand
People from Wellington City